Janet Dancey is a Canadian oncologist. In 2014, she was appointed director of the NCIC Clinical Trials Group and received a second term in 2020. In the same year, Dancey was also elected a Fellow of the Canadian Academy of Health Sciences.

References

External links

Living people
Year of birth missing (living people)
University of Ottawa alumni
Academic staff of Queen's University at Kingston
Fellows of the Canadian Academy of Health Sciences
Canadian oncologists
Women oncologists